Gibberula pascuana is a species of sea snail, a marine gastropod mollusk, in the family Cystiscidae.

References

pascuana
Gastropods described in 1980
Cystiscidae